Lyudmila Ivanovna Chernykh (June 13, 1935 in Shuya, Ivanovo Oblast – July 28, 2017) was a Russian-Soviet astronomer, wife and colleague of Nikolai Stepanovich Chernykh, and a prolific discoverer of minor planets.

Professional career 

In 1959 she graduated from Irkutsk State Pedagogical Institute (now Pedagogical Institute of Irkutsk State University). Between 1959 and 1963 she worked in the Time and Frequency Laboratory of the All-Union Research Institute of Physico-Technical and Radiotechnical Measurements in Irkutsk, where she did astrometrical observations for the Time Service.

Between 1964 and 1998 she was a scientific worker at the Institute of Theoretical Astronomy of the USSR Academy of Sciences (Russian Academy of Science since 1991), working at the observation base of the institute at the Crimean Astrophysical Observatory (CrAO) in Nauchnyy settlement on the Crimean peninsula. In 1998 she was promoted to senior scientific worker at CrAO. The Minor Planet Center (MPC) credits her with the discovery of 267 numbered minor planets, which she made at CrAO between 1966 and 1992. Several of these discoveries she made in collaboration with her husband and with Tamara Smirnova.

Honors 

The asteroid 2325 Chernykh, discovered in 1979 by Czech astronomer Antonín Mrkos, was named in her and her husband's honour. The official naming citation was published by the MPC on 1 June 1981.

List of discovered minor planets 

Two of her notable discoveries are 2127 Tanya – named after Russian child diarist Tanya Savicheva, and 2212 Hephaistos, a near-Earth object of the Apollo group of asteroids.

References

External links 
 Людмила Ивановна Черных
 Parajanov Asteroid discovered by L. Chernykh

1935 births
2017 deaths
Discoverers of asteroids

People from Shuya
Russian women scientists
Soviet astronomers
Women astronomers